This is the List of municipalities in Bayburt Province, Turkey  .

References 

Geography of Bayburt Province
Bayburt